Mustafa Pasha Bridge (Star most) or The Old Bridge is a 16th-century arch bridge over the Maritsa in Svilengrad, southern Bulgaria. Completed in 1529, it was built on the order of the Ottoman vizier Çoban Mustafa Pasha. The bridge was the first major work designed by the Ottoman architect Mimar Sinan, and was part of a vakıf complex that also included a caravanserai, mosque, bazaar and hamam. The bridge is 295 m long, 6 m wide and has 20 or 21 arches.

The English traveler Peter Mundy crossed the bridge on 14 May 1620, by when the neighbouring town was already known as "Mustapha Pasha Cupreesee" (Mustapha Pasha's Bridge):

A flood destroyed some of the arches in 1766. Reconstruction was completed in 1809. The Ottoman army unsuccessfully attempted to destroy the bridge as it retreated from a Bulgarian advance after the Battle of Lule Burgas during the First Balkan War in November 1912.

A plaque on the bridge has inscriptions in Bulgarian, French and English. The English text reads:

References and notes

Ottoman bridges in Bulgaria
Bridges completed in 1529
Buildings and structures in Haskovo Province
Stone arch bridges